Odolena Voda is a town in Prague-East District in the Central Bohemian Region of the Czech Republic. It has about 6,200 inhabitants.

Administrative parts
The village of Dolínek is an administrative part of Odolena Voda.

Etymology
The name means "Odolen's Water". The settlement was named after the knight Odolen of Střížovice and refers to the sufficient water in the area in earlier times.

Geography
It lies on the border between the Prague Plateau and Central Elbe Table.

History
The first written mention of Odolena Voda is from 1352.

Demographics

Economy
The biggest aircraft manufacturer in the Czech Republic, Aero Vodochody, is based in the town. It was founded in 1953.

Transport
the D8 motorway from Prague to Ústí nad Labem passes next to the town.

Sights
The Church of Saint Clement was built by the architect Kilian Ignaz Dientzenhofer in the Baroque style in 1733–1735.

Notable people
Vítězslav Hálek (1835–1874), poet, writer and journalist
Stanislav Huml (1955–2021), politician

Gallery

References

External links

Cities and towns in the Czech Republic
Populated places in Prague-East District